The 124th Duchess of Connaught's Own Baluchistan Infantry was an infantry regiment of the British Indian Army raised in 1820 as the 2nd (Marine) Battalion 12th Regiment of Bombay Native Infantry. It was designated as the 124th Duchess of Connaught's Own Baluchistan Infantry in 1903 and became 1st Battalion 10th Baluch Regiment in 1922. In 1947, it was allocated to Pakistan Army, where it continues to exist as 6th Battalion of The Baloch Regiment.

Early history
The regiment was raised in June 1820 at Bombay as the 2nd (Marine) Battalion 12th Regiment of Bombay Native Infantry by Captain Deschamps. In 1824, it was designated as the 24th Regiment of Bombay Native Infantry. On 19 January 1839, it stormed and captured the city of Aden as part of a punitive expedition sent to rid the area of pirates. During the Indian Rebellion of 1857-58, the regiment, under the command of Major WG Duncan, operated in Central India against the Marathas led by Tatya Tope and the Rani of Jhansi. In December 1857, it joined the Central India Field Force and during the next six months, fought in several major engagements, including the storming of the fortress of Rahatgarh, the Relief of Saugor, the capture of Jhansi and the Battle of Kalpi, where the Mahratta Army was decisively defeated. It remained employed in mopping up operations till 15 December 1858. During the campaign, it suffered a total of 52 casualties. In 1879-80, it participated in the Second Afghan War, where it was deployed on the line of communication.

In 1891,  the regiment was localized to the Province of Baluchistan and reconstituted with Balochis, Brahuis, Pathans and Punjabi Muslims. It adopted uniform of drab colour with red trousers and its designation was changed to 24th (Baluchistan) Regiment of Bombay Infantry. In 1895, the Duchess of Connaught was appointed the Colonel-in-Chief of the regiment. In 1896, it was dispatched to British East Africa under the command of Lieutenant Colonel AA Pearson to suppress a rebellion in areas now forming Kenya. In 1901, the regiment's designation was changed to 24th (Duchess of Connaught's Own) Baluchistan Infantry.

124th Duchess of Connaught's Own Baluchistan Infantry
Subsequent to the reforms brought about in the Indian Army by Lord Kitchener in 1903, all former Bombay Army units had 100 added to their numbers. Consequently, the regiment's designation was changed to 124th Duchess of Connaught's Own Baluchistan Infantry and it was delocalized from Baluchistan.

On the outbreak of the First World War, the regiment was sent to Persia in 1916, where it raised a second battalion later that year. The 2nd Battalion served with great gallantry in the Mesopotamian Campaign, where it fought in the Battles of Khudaira Bend, Jebel Hamrin and Tikrit. In 1918, it proceeded to Palestine and took part in the Battle of Megiddo, which led to the defeat of Turkish Army in Palestine. In the meantime, a third battalion was raised in 1917, which served in South Persia and later, in the Third Afghan War of 1919 and during the Arab uprising in Iraq in 1920. The 1st Battalion also served in the Third Afghan War. During the First World War, the three battalions of 124th DCO Baluchistan Infantry suffered a total of 1179 casualties including 459 killed or died of disease.

Subsequent History
In 1921, the 3/124th DCO Baluchistan Infantry was disbanded, while the remaining two battalions were grouped with four other Baluch battalions: 126th Baluchistan Infantry, 127th Queen Mary's Own Baluch Light Infantry, 129th Duke of Connaught's Own Baluchis and the 130th King George's Own Baluchis (Jacob's Rifles), to form the 10th Baluch Regiment in 1922. The 1/124th DCO Baluchistan Infantry became the 1st Battalion and 2/124th DCO Baluchistan Infantry the 10th (Training) Battalion of the new regiment. During the Second World War, 1/10th Baluch (DCO) served in Iran, Iraq, Syria and Lebanon. In 1943, the 10th Battalion became the 10th Baluch Regimental Centre. In 1945, the 10th Baluch Regiment lost its number and became The Baluch Regiment. On the independence of Pakistan in 1947, it was allocated to Pakistan Army. In 1956, on the merger of 8th Punjab and Bahawalpur Regiments with the Baluch Regiment, 1 Baluch was redesignated as 6 Baluch (now 6 Baloch). During the Indo-Pakistan War of 1965, the battalion served in the Rann of Kutch and Kasur Sectors.

Genealogy
1820 -	2nd (Marine) Battalion 12th Regiment Bombay Native Infantry
1823 -	2nd Battalion 12th Regiment Bombay Native Infantry
1824 -	24th Regiment Bombay Native Infantry
1885 -	24th Regiment Bombay Infantry
1891 -	24th (Baluchistan) Regiment Bombay Infantry
1895 -	24th (Baluchistan) (Duchess of Connaught's Own) Regiment of Bombay Infantry
1901 -	24th (Duchess of Connaught's Own) Baluchistan Infantry
1903 -	124th Duchess of Connaught's Own Baluchistan Infantry
1917 -	1st Battalion 124th Duchess of Connaught's Own Baluchistan Infantry
1922 -	1st Battalion (Duchess of Connaught's Own) 10th Baluch Regiment or 1/10th Baluch
1945 -	1st Battalion (Duchess of Connaught's Own) The Baluch Regiment or 1 Baluch
1956 -	6th Battalion The Baluch Regiment or 6 Baluch
1991 -	6th Battalion The Baloch Regiment or 6 Baloch

See also

10th Baluch Regiment
The Baloch Regiment
Lieutenant William Alexander Kerr, VC
General Sir Alfred Astley Pearson, KCB
British East Africa 1896

References

Further reading
 Ahmad, Lt Col Rifat Nadeem. (2010). Battle Honours of the Baloch Regiment. Abbottabad: The Baloch Regimental Centre.
 Ahmed, Maj Gen Rafiuddin. (1998). History of the Baloch Regiment 1820-1939. Abbottabad: The Baloch Regimental Centre. 
 Ahmed, Maj Gen Rafiuddin. (2000). History of the Baloch Regiment 1939-1956. Abbottabad: The Baloch Regimental Centre. 
 Barthorp, Michael, & Jeffrey Burn. (1979). Indian Infantry Regiments 1860–1914. Osprey Publishing. 
 Cadell, Sir Patrick. (1938). History of the Bombay Army. London: Longmans & Green
 Chaldecott, Lt Col OA. (1935). The First Battalion (DCO) and the Tenth Battalion, the Tenth Baluch Regiment. Aldershot: Gale & Polden.
Gaylor, John (1992). Sons of John Company: Indian and Pakistan Armies, 1903-1991, Spellmount Publishers Ltd. .

External links
History of the Baloch Regiment 1820–1939 the Colonial Period, text of pages 1 to 15 available online as download preview

Baloch Regiment
British Indian Army infantry regiments
Military units and formations established in 1820
Military units and formations disestablished in 1922